Louis Steven Clark (born July 3, 1964) is a former professional American football player who played wide receiver for six seasons for the Seattle Seahawks of the National Football League (NFL).  His brother David Clark also played in MLB He is currently the senior director of pro personnel for the Los Angeles Chargers.

References

External links
Jacksonville Jaguars bio

1964 births
American football wide receivers
Seattle Seahawks players
Mississippi State Bulldogs football players
Living people
Jacksonville Jaguars executives
Philadelphia Eagles executives
Amsterdam Admirals coaches